James Leo Tancred (12 February 1903 – 1 May 1965) was a rugby union player who represented Australia.

Tancred, a prop, was born in Sydney and claimed a total of 3 international rugby caps for Australia.

References

External links

Australian rugby union players
Australia international rugby union players
1903 births
1965 deaths
Rugby union players from Sydney
Rugby union props